Ryzhkin (from рыжий which refers to a color between red and yellow) is a Russian masculine surname, its feminine counterpart is Ryzhkina. It may refer to
Marianna Ryzhkina (born 1971), Russian ballet dancer
Viktor Ryzhkin (born 1937), Soviet ice dancer 
Vladimir Ryzhkin (1930–2011), Soviet football player

Russian-language surnames